Piano Man: The Very Best of Billy Joel is a greatest hits album by Billy Joel, originally released on 15 November 2004. The album was re-released on 10 July 2006 with a DVD included. The CD contains 18 of his biggest hits, and the DVD contains 10 videos (some of which are live). The digital reissue of the compilation contains Joel's popular album track "Vienna" as the last track.

Track listing

Australian version

DVD

Charts

Weekly charts

Year-end charts

Certifications

References 

2004 greatest hits albums
Billy Joel compilation albums